Joe Dunne (born 1973) is an Irish football manager and former footballer.

Joe Dunne may also refer to:
 Joe Dunne (artist) (born 1957), Irish artist
 Joe Dunne (British Army soldier) (1914–2014), sergeant in the Irish Guards
 Joe E. Dunne (1881–1963), American politician from Oregon
 Joe Dunne (footballer, born 2001), English footballer

See also
 Joe Dunn (disambiguation)